Alexandra "Alex" Udinov is one of the main characters on the television series Nikita, portrayed by Lyndsy Fonseca.

Character arc

Background
Alex is the daughter of the late Russian oligarch Nikolai Udinov and his wife, who were murdered by the Division on orders of Sergei Semak when Alex was a child. Udinov owned the billion-dollar company Zetrov, of which Alex was the sole heir. Nikita saves Alex and kills her father, and she watches the rest of her family perish in a fire. Nikita cannot protect Alex from anything else as she has to return to the Division, and she gives Alex to one of Udinov's associates for safe-keeping. Instead, Alex is sold into sex slavery by her father's associate since he needed money and thought no one would recognize her if he did.

To keep her from fighting against them, the slavers keep Alex intoxicated and force her to become a drug addict. She escapes the slavers, though she remains a user. Alex brings this part of her past up to Amanda, saying that the slavers "had the decency to keep [her] high" as they held her captive, comparing it to Division.

After Nikita escapes Division, she finds Alex again and rescues her before she is about to get raped and forces her to get clean. After Nikita helps Alex get past the worst part of her withdrawal, she starts to train her both mentally and physically to stay one step ahead of Division once she is inserted there. Nikita makes it clear to Alex that once she gets in, she will be on her own and Nikita will not be able to help her if something goes wrong.

Alex suffers panic attacks when certain things trigger suppressed memories from her past, such as being under a car. Alex also has nightmares about her deceased family, often speaking Russian and screaming for her father. Amanda and Nikita do not allow Alex to drink alcohol to keep her from relapsing.

Season 1
Alex is arrested while robbing a drug store with her abusive boyfriend, Ronnie; Ronnie shoots the store owner and runs away as the police arrive, leaving Alex with the stolen drugs. Alex is blamed for the murder and sent to prison—shortly after, Alex wakes up in Division, with her cover story being that she committed suicide in prison, and meets with Michael, who brings her into the organization as a new recruit.

It is revealed that this ploy was created by Nikita, who portrayed Ronnie in the robbery so that Alex could get into Division as a mole. Saving Alex is the first time Nikita defied her orders from the Division to kill her entire family.

Season 2
Alex works with the Division to gather the intel and resources she needs to reclaim her birthright. She claims that she is merely using the Division and has gone on missions if they provided vital information on Semak. Percy agrees to feed information to Amanda if Alex is the one sent to talk to him. Since Alex is separated from Nikita, she turns to Amanda for counsel. Alex disobeys Amanda by assassinating Anton Kochenko, and the Division tries to make Alex abort the mission after Nikita messes up their plans. When Alex returns, Amanda is angry that Alex disobeyed a direct order but doesn't punish her. Alex is also manipulated by Percy.

Alex reconciles with Nikita and betrays Amanda and Ari. She reclaims her father's empire and rescues her mother. She later assists Nikita in her raid on Division, which ends successfully with the deaths of Percy and Roan, and with Ryan Fletcher being placed by the US government to be Division's director.

Season 3
Alex reprises her alter ego, the spoiled Russian princess Alexandra Udinov. Liza's abduction brings up painful old memories for Alex, who tries to get closer to Liza's mother. Nikita, Michael, and Sean attempt to stop a terrorist attack but are one man down after Alex is shot to save Nikita by taking a bullet to her shoulder, Nikita goes to kill Mia for revenge. After Alex gets sick of waiting in Division's medical bay and hurts after her and Sean's conversation, she tells Nikita that she is going on the mission to Amanda's house with her. Nikita reluctantly allows her, and Alex is beaten and left in immense pain.

When she returns to the division, she secretly takes more pills, and she begins to get addicted to them. Michael eventually confronts her, and she tells Nikita the truth. Nikita is disappointed and angry at Alex, but she later tells her that they will handle her addiction together.

In Episode 10, Ryan allows Alex to go back out into the field. Sean becomes jealous of Alex's relationship with Owen. She tells Owen things about her past that she cannot tell Sean because Sean grew up in a regular American family, and she is afraid of him judging her or not understanding her. Amanda holds Alex hostage and tells Nikita she will release Alex in exchange for Ari. Amanda "brainwashes" Alex with "the chair" by forming bridges where they are not supposed to, making her irrational and mentally unstable.

Alex recruits Birkoff to dig up secrets on Danforth to use as leverage in case complications arise with the government. They are shocked when they find out that the president has made a kill house and is ready to wipe out all of the division with the marines that are trained. Alex and Sean are tasked with investigating who inside the division is behind a mutiny. The mole is revealed to be Alex, but only the mutineers and Ryan know; Ryan is in a coma because Alex shot him. Alex confesses her desire to leave Division to Birkhoff and almost gets him aboard until Sean interrupts them.

Reception

Lyndsy Fonseca has received generally positive reviews for her portrayal of Alex. Jonah Krakow of IGN called Alex "a beautiful young woman" and said that "Alex's story was [his] favorite part of the show". Episodes such as "2.0" and "Alexandra" were praised by critics for the look into Alex's past and background. Gabrielle Compolongo of TV Fanatic said that "Alex plays the clueless trainee perfectly" and she does "every intelligent thing" not to be caught. Luke Holland of Den of Geek also praised Alex's abilities, saying that Fonseca showed "breadth in her abilities".

References

Fictional assassins
Television characters introduced in 2010
Fictional drug addicts
Fictional Russian people
Fictional women soldiers and warriors
Fictional prostitutes
Nikita (TV series)
Action television characters
Fictional slaves
Fictional female secret agents and spies